The Osaka Journals is the second album from Sajama Cut. It was released in 2005, with distribution help from the major label Universal Music Indonesia. Sajama Cut released 2 singles (and 2 videos) for "Fallen Japanese", and "Alibi".

The album received critical acclaim in the Indonesian media, with The Jakarta Post giving it a positive review.

Track listing
 Season Finale
 Fallen Japanese
 Alibi
 Scarllet (Paramour)
 It Was Kyoto, Where I Died
 Take Care, Inamorata
 Idol Semen
 Lagu Tema
 Nemesis/Murder
 Fin
 Less Afraid (bonus track)

References

2005 albums
Sajama Cut albums